Cyclopropanone is an organic compound with molecular formula (CH2)2CO consisting of a cyclopropane carbon framework with a ketone functional group. The parent compound is labile, being highly sensitive toward even weak nucleophiles.  Surrogates of cyclopropanone include the ketals.

Preparation
Cyclopropanone has been prepared by reaction of ketene with diazomethane.  These solutions are stable at −78 °C.  In the presence of protic reagents such as carboxylic acids, primary and secondary amines, and alcohols, cyclopropanone converts to adducts, which are often isolatable at room temperature:
(CH2)2CO  +  X-H   →  (CH2)2C(X)(OH)
(X-H = R2N-H, HO-H, RO-H)

Structure and bonding
The C3O atoms are coplanar. As deduced from the microwave spectrum, the H2C-CH2 bond length of 157.5 pm is unusually long.  By contrast, the C-C bond lengths in cyclopropane are 151 pm. The C=O bond length of 119 pm is short compared to the 123 pm bond length in acetone.

The value of νC=O in the infrared spectrum is near 1815 cm−1, ca. 70 cm−1 higher than values for a typical ketone.

Derivatives
Cyclopropanones are intermediates in the Favorskii rearrangement with cyclic ketones where carboxylic acid formation is accompanied by ring-contraction.

Cyclopropanones react as 1,3-dipoles in cycloadditions for instance with cyclic dienes such as furan. An oxyallyl intermediate or valence tautomer (formed by cleavage of the C2-C3 bond) is suggested as the active intermediate or even a biradical structure (compare to the related trimethylenemethane).

Other reactions of cyclopropanones take place through this intermediate. For instance enantiopure (+)-trans-2,3-di-tert-butylcyclopropanone racemizes when heated to 80 °C.

An oxyallyl intermediate is also proposed in the photochemical conversion of a 3,5-dihydro-4H-pyrazole-4-one with expulsion of nitrogen to an indane:

In this reaction oxyallyl intermediate A, in chemical equilibrium with cyclopropanone B attacks the phenyl ring through its carbocation forming a transient 1,3-cyclohexadiene C (with UV trace similar to isotoluene) followed by rearomatization. The energy difference between A and B is 5 to 7 kcal/mol (21 to 29 kJ/mol).

Coprine
The cyclopropanone derivative 1-aminocyclopropanol occurs naturally by hydrolyzes of coprine, a toxin in some mushrooms. 1-Aminocyclopropanol is an inhibitor of the enzyme acetaldehyde dehydrogenase.

See also
 Other cyclic ketones: cyclobutanone, cyclopentanone, cyclohexanone
 Other cyclopropane derivatives: cyclopropene, cyclopropenone

References

3
Cyclopropanes